Novaya Poltavka is a rural locality (a selo) and the administrative center of Novopoltavskoye Rural Settlement, Staropoltavsky District, Volgograd Oblast, Russia. The population was 990 as of 2010. There are 9 streets.

Geography 
Novaya Poltavka is located in steppe, on Transvolga, 10 km southwest of Staraya Poltavka (the district's administrative centre) by road. Staraya Poltavka is the nearest rural locality.

References 

Rural localities in Staropoltavsky District